Curvibacter fontanus is a bacterium from the genus Curvibacter and  family  Comamonadaceae, which was isolated from well water.

References

External links
Type strain of Curvibacter fontanus at BacDive -  the Bacterial Diversity Metadatabase

Burkholderiaceae
Bacteria described in 2010